The genus Axarus is widely distributed with records from the Holarctic, the Neotropics and Australasia . There are currently 5 described nearctic species . Erected as a subgenus (Anceus) of Xenochironomus , Axarus was subsequently renamed and elevated to generic status . The Connecticut River in the eastern United States harbors locally dense populations of two Axarus species, both currently undescribed. These populations are interesting in that they are restricted to specific larval habitat (varve clay and sometimes rotting wood) and thus there is genetic structure between populations in the river . The Connecticut River species are also notable in that they have extremely well developed polytene chromosomes and also maintain a high degree of inversion polymorphism .

Species
A. dorneri (Malloch, 1915)
A. festivus Say, 1823
A. rogersi (Beck and Beck, 1958)
A. scopula (Townes, 1945)
A. taenionotus (Say, 1829)

References

Chironomidae